Michael K. Reiter is a fellow of the Association for Computing Machinery and a James B. Duke Professor at Duke University. He was formerly the Lawrence M. Slifkin Distinguished Professor of Computer Science at the University of North Carolina at Chapel Hill.  He was previously a professor of electrical and computer engineering and computer science at Carnegie Mellon University in Pittsburgh.  Reiter's research interests are in computer and communications security and distributed computing.

References

External links 
 Michael Reiter home page at the Department of Computer Science, University of North Carolina at Chapel Hill
 

American computer scientists
Carnegie Mellon University faculty
Computer systems researchers
Cornell University alumni
Fellows of the Association for Computing Machinery
Living people
Researchers in distributed computing
University of North Carolina at Chapel Hill alumni
University of North Carolina at Chapel Hill faculty
Engineers from North Carolina
Year of birth missing (living people)